Tapio is a Finnish forest spirit or god in Finnish mythology. Hunters prayed to him before a hunt. His wife is the goddess of the forest, Mielikki. He is the father of Annikki, Tellervo, Nyyrikki (the god of hunting), and Tuulikki. Fitting the Green Man archetype, Tapio has a beard of lichen and eyebrows of moss. 

Mikael Agricola mentions Tapio as a Tavastian god in the prologue to his Finnish translation of the Book of Psalms, .

He lends his name, in the form of Tapiola, to: 

 one of the major urban centres within the city of Espoo outside Helsinki; and 
 an unincorporated community in the US state of Michigan. 

He has appeared various times in songs by Finnish metal bands. For example, in the symphonic metal band Nightwish's song, "Elvenpath", he is referred to as "Tapio, Bear-king, Ruler of the forest". The name has also been used extensively by the folk metal band Korpiklaani, especially in their album Spirit of the Forest.

Jean Sibelius' tone poem Tapiola (1926) is a depiction of the forest Tapio inhabits.

References

Finnish gods
Hunting gods
Characters in the Kalevala
Tree gods